The 1928 Illinois Fighting Illini football team was an American football team that represented the University of Illinois during the 1928 college football season.  In their 16th season under head coach Robert Zuppke, the Illini compiled a 7–1 record and finished in first place in the Big Ten Conference. Tackle Albert J. Nowack was the team captain. The team was ranked No. 6 in the nation in the Dickinson System ratings released in December 1928.

Schedule

Roster

Head Coach: Robert Zuppke (15th year at Illinois)

References

Illinois
Illinois Fighting Illini football seasons
Big Ten Conference football champion seasons
Illinois Fighting Illini football